Xuân Dương may refer to several places in Vietnam, including:

, a rural commune of Thanh Oai District
Xuân Dương, Bắc Kạn, a rural commune of Na Rì District
, a rural commune of Lộc Bình District
, a rural commune of Thường Xuân District